The Dardanelles is a strait and internationally significant waterway in northwestern Turkey.

Dardanelles may also refer to:

Geography
 Dardanelle, Arkansas, a city in Yell County, Arkansas, United States
 Dardanelles and Freel Roadless Areas
 Dardanelles Cone, a mountain peak in the Carson-Iceberg Wilderness on the Stanislaus National Forest

History 
 Treaty of the Dardanelles (1809) 
 Battle of the Dardanelles (disambiguation), several battles

WW1 campaign 
 Dardanelles Gun, a Turkish 15th-century siege cannon
 Dardanelles Operation (1807), an operation during Anglo-Turkish war
 Dardanelles Fortified Area Command, a, Ottoman fortified area command that was formed to defend against attacks on the Dardanelles from the Aegean Sea
 Dardanelles campaign, a campaign of the First World War that took place on the Gallipoli peninsula
 Dardanelles Commission,  an investigation into the disastrous 1915 Dardanelles Campaign
 Dardanelles campaign medal, a French military medal bestowed for participation in the Battle of the Dardanelles

Other
Dardanelle Breckenbridge (1917-1997), American blues/jazz singer known by her stage name "Dardanelle"
 Dardanelles (band), an indie rock band from Melbourne, Australia
Dardanelles (EP) (2006), a self-titled debut extended play by the band
The Dardanelles (band), a Canadian folk music group from Newfoundland and Labrador